Mozambique have participated in six Commonwealth Games since joining the Commonwealth in 1995.

Medals

See also
All-time medal tally of Commonwealth Games
Mozambique
Commonwealth Games Federation

References

External links
Mozambique National Olympic Committee
Commonwealth Games Federation

 
Nations at the Commonwealth Games